Merle Marie Menje (born 19 August 2004) is a German para-athlete and para cross-country skier who competes in international elite competitions. She is a double European champion and is selected to compete at the 2020 Summer Paralympics.

References

External links
 
 

2004 births
Living people
Sportspeople from Mainz
Paralympic athletes of Germany
Paralympic cross-country skiers of Germany
German wheelchair racers
Female wheelchair racers
Athletes (track and field) at the 2020 Summer Paralympics
Medalists at the World Para Athletics European Championships
People with spina bifida
21st-century German women